FC Sancti Spíritus is a Cuban football club, based in the city of Sancti Spíritus, which currently plays in the Campeonato Nacional de Fútbol. Its home stadium is the 2,843-capacity Estadio Terreno la Formadora.

Current squad

References

Sancti Spiritus
Sancti Spíritus